NSO or Nso may refer to:

N.S.O.
 NATO Standardization Office
 Netherlands Space Office
 National Statistics Office (Philippines)
 Nationale SIGINT Organisatie, the Netherlands
 National Safeman's Organization of safe technicians, US
 National Socialist Order, the rebranded name of Atomwaffen Division
 National Solar Observatory, U.S.A.
 National Symphony Orchestra (disambiguation), orchestras of several countries
 Nigerian Security Organization, security forces 1976-1985
 Nintendo Switch Online
 NSO Group (Niv, Shalev, Omri), an Israeli phone spyware company
 Non-qualified stock option
 Non-Skating Official in roller derby

Nso
 Nso people of Cameroon
 Nso language (ISO 639-3 language code: lns)

Other uses
 Northern Sotho language (ISO 639-2 language code: nso)
 Scone Airport (IATA airport code: NSO), Upper Hunter Valley, New South Wales, Australia
 Aerolíneas Sosa (ICAO airline code: NSO), Honduran airline
 Nashipur Road railway station (train station code: NSO), West Bengal, India

See also

 NS0 cell, a model cell line
 
 Country Code Names Supporting Organization (ccNSO)